The 1997 UEFA–CAF Meridian Cup was the first UEFA–CAF Meridian Cup and was held in Portugal.

Teams

  (host nation)

Group stage
In the following tables:

Key:
Pld Matches played, W Won, D Drawn, L Lost, GF Goals for, GA Goals against, GD Goal Difference, Pts Points

Group A

Group B

Knockout stage

Third-place play-off

UEFA–CAF Meridian Cup
1997 in Portuguese sport
Meridan
International association football competitions hosted by Portugal
Mer